Naskent (Dargwa: Няскунт) is a rural locality (a selo) in Levashinsky District, Republic of Dagestan, Russia. The population was 2,949 as of 2010. There are 39 streets.

Geography 
Naskent is located 8 km south of Levashi (the district's administrative centre) by road. Khasakent and Ebdalaya are the nearest rural localities.

Nationalities 
Dargins live there.

References 

Rural localities in Levashinsky District